The 1931 Colorado Agricultural Aggies football team represented Colorado Agricultural College (now known as Colorado State University) in the Rocky Mountain Conference (RMC) during the 1931 college football season.  In their 22nd season under head coach Harry W. Hughes, the Aggies compiled a 5–4 record (5–2 against conference opponents), tied for second place in the RMC, and were outscored by a total of 138 to 137.

Schedule

References

Colorado Agricultural
Colorado State Rams football seasons
Colorado Agricultural Aggies football